Ostoja Rajaković (d. October 1379) was a Serbian nobleman in the service of Marko Mrnjavčević. He governed land around Ohrid. He was the son-in-law of župan (count) Andrea Gropa. He belonged to the Ugarčić family that hailed from Nevesinje.

References

External links

14th-century Serbian nobility
1379 deaths
People from Ohrid Municipality
Serbs of North Macedonia
Boyars of Stefan Dušan